Rhizlane Siba (born 29 February 1996) is a Moroccan track and field athlete who competes in the high jump. She has been African champion at youth, junior and senior level, winning the main continental title at the 2014 African Championships in Athletics. She is also twice gold medallist at the Arab Athletics Championships (winning her first at age fifteen) and was the 2011 Pan Arab Games winner.

The daughter of Ahmed and Aicha Siba, she grew up with her two siblings, Zineb and Amin. She gained a scholarship to attend Kansas State University and study business administration. While there she competed for the Kansas State Wildcats and made the top six at the Big 12 Conference Championships.

International competitions

References

External links

Living people
1996 births
Moroccan high jumpers
Female high jumpers
Moroccan female athletes
Kansas State Wildcats women's track and field athletes
Moroccan expatriates in the United States
Athletes (track and field) at the 2019 African Games
African Games medalists in athletics (track and field)
African Games silver medalists for Morocco
20th-century Moroccan women
21st-century Moroccan women
Athletes (track and field) at the 2022 Mediterranean Games